Below are the results of season 10 of the World Poker Tour (2011–2012).

Results

WPT Spanish Championship
 Casino: Casino Barcelona, Barcelona, Spain
 Buy-in: €3200 + €300
 5-Day Event: May 25–29, 2011
 Number of Entries: 216
 Total Prize Pool: €691,200
 Number of Payouts: 27

WPT Slovenia
 Casino: Grand Casino Portorož, Portorož
 Buy-in: €3000 + €300
 5-Day Event: Jul 17–21, 2011
 Number of Entries: 141
 Total Prize Pool: €410,244
 Number of Payouts: 14

Legends of Poker
 Casino: The Bicycle Casino, Bell Gardens, California
 Buy-in: $3500 + $200
 6-Day Event: Aug 25–30, 2011
 Number of Entries: 757
 Total Prize Pool: $2,570,015
 Number of Payouts: 81

WPT Grand Prix de Paris
 Casino: Aviation Club de France, Paris, France
 Buy-in: €7500
 6-Day Event: Sep 5–10, 2011
 Number of Entries: 312
 Total Prize Pool: €2,252,650
 Number of Payouts: 36

Borgata Poker Open
 Casino: Borgata Hotel Casino, Atlantic City, New Jersey
 Buy-in: $3300 + $200
 5-Day Event: Sep 18–22, 2011
 Number of Entries: 1,313
 Total Prize Pool: $4,220,161
 Number of Payouts: 100

WPT Malta
 Casino: Casino at Portomaso, Portomaso
 Buy-in: €3000 + €300
 5-Day Event: Sep 20–24, 2011
 Number of Entries: 240
 Total Prize Pool: €698,400
 Number of Payouts: 27

World Poker Finals
 Casino: Foxwoods Resort Casino, Mashantucket, Connecticut
 Buy-in: $9,700 + $300
 6-Day Event: 	Oct 27 – Nov 1, 2011
 Number of Entries: 189
 Total Prize Pool: $1,778,550
 Number of Payouts: 27

WPT Amnéville
 Casino: Seven Casino d Amnéville, Amnéville, France
 Buy-in: €3200 + €300
 6-Day Event: 	Nov 1–6, 2011
 Number of Entries: 379
 Total Prize Pool: €1,167,866
 Number of Payouts: 36

WPT Jacksonville
 Casino: BestBet Poker Room at Orange Park, Orange Park, Florida
 Buy-in: $3,500
 5-Day Event: Nov 18–22, 2011
 Number of Entries: 393
 Total Prize Pool: $1,277,250
 Number of Payouts: 40

WPT Marrakech
 Casino: Casino De Marrakech, Marrakech
 Buy-in: €2700 + €300
 4-Day Event: Nov 24–27, 2011
 Number of Entries: 274
 Total Prize Pool: €727,434
 Number of Payouts: 33

WPT Prague
 Casino: Corinthia Casino, Prague
 Buy-in: €3200 + €300
 5-Day Event: Dec 1–5, 2011
 Number of Entries: 571
 Total Prize Pool: €1,753,200
 Number of Payouts: 63

Five Diamond World Poker Classic
 Casino: Bellagio, Las Vegas, Nevada
 Buy-in: $10,000 + $300
 6-Day Event: Dec 6–11, 2011
 Number of Entries: 413
 Total Prize Pool: $4,006,100
 Number of Payouts: 100

WPT Venice
 Casino: Casino di Venezia, Venice
 Buy-in: €3000 + €300
 6-Day Event: Dec 13–18, 2011
 Number of Entries: 213
 Total Prize Pool: €600,830
 Number of Payouts: 27

WPT Ireland
 Casino: Citywest Hotel, Dublin
 Buy-in: €2500
 4-Day Event: 	Jan 5–8, 2012
 Number of Entries: 338
 Total Prize Pool: €760,500
 Number of Payouts: 36

WPT Venice Grand Prix
 Casino: Casino di Venezia, Venice
 Buy-in: €4,950 + €495
 5-Day Event: Feb 6–10, 2012
 Number of Entries: 155
 Total Prize Pool: €678,880
 Number of Payouts: 18

WPT Seminole Hard Rock Lucky Hearts Showdown
 Casino: Seminole Hard Rock Hotel and Casino, Hollywood, Florida
 Buy-in: $3,500
 5-Day Event: Feb 10–14, 2012
 Number of Entries: 295
 Total Prize Pool: $958,750
 Number of Payouts: 27

WPT L.A. Poker Classic
 Casino: Commerce Casino, Los Angeles
 Buy-in: $9,600 + $400
 6-Day Event: Feb 24–29, 2012
 Number of Entries: 549
 Total Prize Pool: $5,270,400
 Number of Payouts: 54

WPT Bay 101 Shooting Star
 Casino: Bay 101 Casino, San Jose, California
 Buy-in: $9,500 + $500
 5-Day Event: Mar 5–9, 2012
 Number of Entries: 364
 Total Prize Pool: $3,458,000
 Number of Payouts: 36

WPT Vienna
 Casino: Montesino Casino, Vienna
 Buy-in: €3,200 + €300
 6-Day Event: 	Apr 10 – 15, 2012
 Number of Entries: 396
 Total Prize Pool: €1,267,200
 Number of Payouts: 45

WPT Seminole Hard Rock Showdown
 Casino: Seminole Hard Rock Hotel and Casino, Hollywood, Florida
 Buy-in: $9,600 + $400
 6-Day Event: Apr 18–23, 2012
 Number of Entries: 290
 Total Prize Pool: $2,784,000
 Number of Payouts: 27

WPT Jacksonville BestBet Open
 Casino: BestBet Poker Room at Jacksonville, Jacksonville, Florida
 Buy-in: $4,700 + $300
 6-Day Event: Apr 27 – May 2, 2012
 Number of Entries: 320
 Total Prize Pool: $1,504,000
 Number of Payouts: 36

WPT World Championship
 Casino: Bellagio, Las Vegas, Nevada
 Buy-in: $25,000 + $500
 8-Day Event: 	May 19–26, 2012
 Number of Entries: 152
 Total Prize Pool: $3,660,500
 Number of Payouts: 18

Other Events
During season 10 of the WPT there was one special event that did not apply to the Player of the Year standings:
 The WPT World Championship Super High Roller – May 23–25, 2012 – Bellagio – coincident with end of Event #22: WPT World Championship

Season X Player of the Year

Top 6 players, including ties.

References

External links
 World Poker Tour

World Poker Tour
2011 in poker
2012 in poker